The 1972 Montreal Museum of Fine Arts robbery, sometimes called the Skylight Caper, took place very early in the morning of September 4 of that year. Three armed robbers used a skylight under repair to gain entry to the museum from its roof, tied up the three guards on duty, and left on foot with 18 paintings, including a rare Rembrandt landscape and works by Jan Brueghel the Elder, Corot, Delacroix, Rubens, and Thomas Gainsborough, as well as some figurines and jewellery. One of the Brueghels was returned by the thieves as an initiative to start ransom negotiations. None of the other paintings has ever been recovered and the robbers have never been arrested or even publicly identified, although there is at least one informal suspect.

Collectively, the missing paintings have been valued at $11.7 million in 2017 dollars; although their value may have diminished since the theft as scholars have called the attribution of some of the works into question. However, the Rembrandt alone has been valued at $1 million; in 2003 The Globe and Mail estimated it to have appreciated in value to $20 million. The thieves appeared to know what works they were looking for; many of the works had been part of Masterpieces from Montreal, a travelling exhibition that had been to many museums in the U.S. and Canada prior to Expo 67, as well as some other special exhibits put on by the museum in the preceding years. It is not only the largest art theft in Canada but the largest theft in Canadian history.

Investigation of the crime proved difficult in the early going, since it occurred over the Labour Day holiday weekend, when many of the museum's officials including its director were vacationing far away from Montreal. It was further complicated by continuing news coverage of the Blue Bird Café fire, Montreal's deadliest arson, three days earlier, dominating the headlines; the next day the killings of Israeli athletes by Palestinian terrorists at the Olympics in Munich further diminished media coverage. A sting operation conceived after the thieves returned the Brueghel (later reattributed to his students) and mailed photos of the other works to the museum seeking a ransom payment went awry; a later attempt to negotiate their return cost the museum $10,000 with no results.

The thieves took advantage of weakened security, resulting from the renovations at the museum, which had left the skylight's alarm disabled. The renovations and the security flaws were themselves a consequence of the museum's tightening finances, which had worsened during the 1960s as many of the wealthy Anglophone community in Montreal that had supported the museum since its founding in 1860 began to leave for Toronto due to increasing concerns over Quebec separatism, especially after terrorist acts by the Front de libération du Québec had led to martial law in the Montreal area two years earlier. Sûreté du Québec, the Royal Canadian Mounted Police and Interpol continue to investigate the crime. Theories as to who might be responsible have ranged from the Montreal Mafia to Quebec separatists.

Background

The Montreal Museum of Fine Arts (MMFA) was established in 1860 as the Art Association of Montreal, to encourage art appreciation in the city. It did not start to exhibit works until the late 1870s and 1880s, when wealthy patrons who had prospered from Canada's industrialization began to donate both cash and works, and it was soon able to build Canada's first space explicitly intended for the exhibition of art. In 1913 it built what is currently its main building, now known as the Michal and Renata Hornstein Pavilion, on Sherbrooke Street in the neighborhood known even today as the Golden Square Mile, because it was home to many of the wealthiest and most successful families in Canada.

These patrons were predominantly of British descent, all members of Montreal's Anglophone elite. At the end of the 1950s, their political and economic domination of the city began to yield to its majority Francophone population, as Quebec separatism began to gain political influence in the province as a whole. Fearing the consequences should the province succeed in seceding, and mindful of the terrorist attacks of the Front de libération du Québec which had led to martial law being declared in the city in 1970, the Anglophone elite began leaving the city over the course of the 1960s.

This slowly deprived the museum of much of its traditional financial support. In 1957, Bill Bantey, a former journalist who was appointed the museum's head of public relations, began reaching out for the first time in its history to Francophones, with some success. But the contributions from newer philanthropists in the city were not as much as their predecessors had been able to give, and public funds from the province only covered 40 percent of the museum's annual budget.

As a result, the museum was having to cut back financially in the early 1970s, going from a strictly private institution to a semi-public nonprofit organization. The museum needed to expand, and it needed to renovate the 1913 William Sutherland Maxwell Beaux-Arts building on Sherbrooke Street. The latter was particularly unsuited to the demands of a late-20th century art museum, with many cramped rooms and corridors. The museum planned to close it in 1973 for a three-year renovation project.

Previous thefts and attempts

On two prior occasions thieves took, or attempted to take, works from the museum.

One night in 1933, a person who had hidden in the museum overnight passed 14 paintings, mostly by Canadian artists, to someone else through an open window in the women's lavatory. Later the museum received a ransom note asking $10,000 for the return of the paintings. Three months later, the English-language Montreal Star and the French La Presse each received half of one of the paintings in the mail. A note along with them said if a ransom of 25 percent of the remaining paintings' total value was not paid, they too would be returned in pieces.

The paintings were recovered before that could occur when Paul Thouin, a petty criminal, was arrested after burglarizing a rail freight car. During interrogation, he confessed to stealing the paintings and led police to where he had buried them, wrapped in a tarpaulin with newspapers, in a one-metre-deep (3 ft) sandpit near the village of L'Épiphanie a short distance northeast of Montreal. Thouin, who had shot and killed a police officer attempting to apprehend him in a railroad warehouse, was reportedly terrified at the prospect of being returned to prison for what would likely be a very long time. He committed suicide by poisoning himself with a concealed dose of strychnine in the police lockup that night, before he could stand trial.

A gang of armed robbers attempted to steal some van Gogh paintings during a special exhibition of the artist's work at the museum in 1960. They were foiled and escaped. They have never been identified.

Labour Day weekend 1972 in Montreal

In Montreal, Labour Day weekend of 1972 began with two major news events, neither of them well received. On the night of Friday, September 1, four men who had been refused entry to a downtown country-and-western bar for being too intoxicated retaliated by setting the club's steps afire; the ensuing blaze killed 37, making it the deadliest fire in the city in 45 years. On the following evening, the Soviet national hockey team defeated their Canadian counterparts 7–3 in the first game of the Summit Series at the  Montreal Forum. Canadians, who had expected their team, composed of National Hockey League stars, to overwhelmingly defeat the Soviets, who had only begun competing in international ice hockey a quarter-century earlier, at what Canadians considered their national sport were stunned. Fans in Montreal were eagerly looking ahead to the next game in the series, to be held Monday evening in Toronto.

At the museum, the board president, director, and director of security were all on vacation in either the United States or Mexico for the holiday weekend. Bantey, the public relations director, was the most senior official in charge.

Robbery

Shortly after midnight on the morning of September 4, police believe, a group of three men gathered out in front of the museum on Sherbrooke Street. They went to the museum's west wall, between it and the Church of St. Andrew and St. Paul. One of the men, who had the same sort of pick-equipped boots used by utility-company workers to climb telephone poles, went up a tree next to the museum and got high enough in it to gain access to the roof. He was able to find a ladder, and lowered it to the other two, who climbed up.

Once the group was on the roof, they went to a skylight that had been covered by a plastic sheet in the course of some ongoing work. They opened the skylight, without setting off any alarm as the plastic sheet had rendered it inoperative, and lowered a  nylon rope to the museum's second floor. All three slid down.

It had taken them almost an hour and a half to gain entry to the museum. Shortly after they did, around 1:30 a.m., one of the three guards on duty was walking to the kitchen to get some tea. He encountered the thieves, their faces covered by ski masks, who fired both barrels of a pump action shotgun into the ceiling to get his attention and made him lie down on the floor. The noise brought the other two guards, who were unable to overpower the thieves, and soon all three guards were taken to a lecture hall where they were bound and gagged.

There, one of the robbers, who carried a .38-caliber Smith & Wesson handgun, stood guard while the other two removed paintings, jewellery and figurines from their displays and brought them to the museum's shipping department. The thieves originally seemed to have planned to leave via the same skylight they had come in through, but eventually concluded it would take too much time to put together a system of pulleys to get themselves and the stolen artwork out. After finding that one of the guards had a set of keys to one of the museum's panel trucks, they decided instead to flee that way.

However, this alternative also went awry. They chose to exit through one of the museum's side entrances, where an alarm went off as they did so. Leaving half their take behind, they fled on foot down Sherbrooke.

Back at the museum, one of the guards worked to free himself. An hour after the robbery ended, around 3 a.m., he succeeded and called Bill Bantey, who told him to call the police. He arrived shortly after the police, along with Ruth Jackson, the museum's curator of decorative arts. After surveying the broken frames, smashed display cases and general disorder the thieves had left, they found that 18 paintings and 38 other pieces had been taken. Collectively they estimated the value of the stolen work at $2 million.

Works stolen

All of the stolen paintings were by European artists from the 17th through 19th centuries:

Landscape with Vehicles and Cattle, attributed at the time to Jan Brueghel the Elder but later reattributed to his students (subsequently recovered)
Landscape with Buildings and Wagon, Jan Brueghel the Elder
La rêveuse á la fontaine (The Dreaming Woman at the Fountain), Jean-Baptiste-Camille Corot
Jeune fille accoudée sur le bras gauche (Young Girl Leaning on Her Left Arm), Corot
Landscape with rocks and stream, Gustave Courbet
Head, Honoré Daumier
Lioness and Lion in a Cave, Eugène Delacroix
The Sorceress, Narcisse Virgilio Díaz
Portrait of Brigadier General Sir Thomas Fletcher, Thomas Gainsborough
Still Life: Vanitas, Jan Davidsz de Heem
Still Life with a Fish, de Heem
La barrateuse (Young Woman Churning), Jean-François Millet
Portrait of Madame Millet, Millet
Portrait of a Man, Possibly a Self-portrait, Giovanni Battista Piazzetta
Landscape with Cottages, Rembrandt van Rijn
Head of a Young Man, Peter Paul Rubens
Portrait of a Lady, François-André Vincent
Portrait of a Man, Vincent

The largest was the Courbet, at 28 by 36 inches, with the Gainsborough and Corot's Dreamer close behind. It was possible that when the thieves ran away each of them held a batch of smaller paintings in one hand and a larger one in the other.

The thieves also took 38 pieces of jewellery and figurines. Among the former pieces were an 18th-century gold watch once owned by the wife of Jacques Viger, Montreal's first mayor; a 19th-century French blue enamel latch box set with diamonds and two 17th-century Spanish pendants.

Investigation

Later that morning, Bantey, who had covered the crime beat in Montreal as a journalist prior to his tenure at the museum, held a news conference to discuss the theft. He identified all the stolen works and described how the robbers had entered the museum and taken them. "They did show quite discriminating taste," he told reporters, "though as far as the objects are concerned, they could do with more art and historical training." In their haste to leave, he noted, the thieves had left behind another Rembrandt as well as works by El Greco, Picasso and Tintoretto that they could as easily have taken.

The news conference was initially effective in publicizing the theft. It, as well as lists of the stolen paintings, were reported as front-page news in many major newspapers across the U.S. and Canada the next morning.

However, further publicity that might have drawn attention to the theft and perhaps helped solve it was stymied by news events of September 5. At that year's Summer Olympics in Munich, Palestinian terrorists with Black September took 11 Israeli athletes hostage, eventually killing them along with a German police officer, the following day. Those events were of particular interest in Montreal since the city was preparing to host the next Olympics, and as a result further news about the art theft got less priority in the media. The investigation would continue, however.

From interviews with the three guards, police learned that there had been three thieves. One spoke French and the other English. The guards also reported that the two spoke with a third, also a Francophone, whom they never were able to see.

Investigators were immediately struck by the similarity to another recent art theft in the Montreal area. On August 30, another group of three thieves had broken into the summer home of Agnes Meldrum, wife of a Montreal moving-company owner, in Oka, roughly 30 kilometres (20 miles) west of the city. They had all climbed up a 200-metre (600-foot) cliff from a powerboat on Lake of Two Mountains to do so. Witnesses said that while they wore hoods to prevent identification, two spoke French and the other, English. Once inside the home they stole paintings worth $50,000 in total.

Inside-job theory

The presence of two Francophones and one Anglophone, plus the climbing skills involved, led the chief investigator on the case to believe the thieves involved in both incidents had been local, and possibly the same. That, and their apparent knowledge of the skylight's non-functional alarm, had at first fostered a theory that someone on the inside at the museum had aided the thieves in some way. This is a common phenomenon when museums are robbed; two New York City detectives who specialized in art crime said as much when commenting about the Montreal case later in 1972.

However, the Montreal police considered that speculation too broad to be helpful in focusing their investigation, and evidence did not bear it out. While it was possible that the thieves had indeed actively involved someone working on the skylight, it was as possible that they, or others involved with them, had learned of the security flaw through an overheard remark somewhere. An intense investigation of the workers involved with the skylight did not find any evidence they had passed information about it to anyone criminally inclined.

It was also seen as possible that the robbers had learned of the skylight flaw by simply reconnoitering their target. Roughly two weeks before the theft, someone reported encountering two men sitting on chairs on the roof, wearing sunglasses and smoking. When questioned by the person who reported the incident, they claimed to be museum employees. But when investigators looked for the chairs on the roof after the theft, they could not be found. Likewise, no fingerprints or other evidence was left on either the ladder or nylon rope.

Theories of an inside job were also undermined by the thieves' poorly planned exit. After abandoning their improvised plan to leave by the same skylight when they realized it would take too long to set up a system of pulleys, they instead chose to try to flee in one of the museum's trucks. If they had based that alternative on inside information they had obtained, they would have known how to disable the alarm they set off on the side entrance before opening it. And even if they had not chosen to do so, they would have known it did not sound anywhere else besides the museum—and thus not have abandoned half of what they had stolen to escape on foot.

Selection of works

While the jewellery and figurines seem to have been chosen only because they could be easily carried, the paintings stolen seem to have been a matter of choice. Their small size, in addition to making them easy to carry and conceal, would also facilitate quick sales. The robbers, and any dealer working with them, might, investigators have speculated, have been looking to sell to private collectors who display their paintings in their homes. Indeed, the pairs of small paintings with similar subject matter by the same artist—Brueghel, Corot, Millet and Vincent—would be excellent choices to decorate a room.

Interest in art in recent years had driven up prices, a phenomenon which had been widely reported in both French- and English-language media, and the thieves would have known even if they had no interest in art what collectors were willing to pay large sums for. Some art dealers in the Montreal area refused to discuss their business with police absent a legal order such as a subpoena or warrant. Around Christmas 1972, a Montreal Gazette columnist reported that, in fact, most of the paintings had been delivered to the homes of wealthy collectors in Mount Royal, with a small portion diverted to the U.S. This led police to interrogate two unnamed individuals, but no new leads developed as a result.

The robbers might not even have had to visit the museum to decide what works to take. Half of those they did keep when they ran away had been in Masterpieces from Montreal, a travelling exhibition that had been to several cities in the U.S. during the year before Expo 67. The Rembrandt had been included in a 1969 exhibit to commemorate the tricentennial of the artist's death, and the following year many of the French paintings had been in another exhibit that the press in that language gave great attention to.

All those works in the special exhibitions would have been depicted in handbooks or catalogues produced in association with them. Only the Brueghels, the Rubens and the Vincent portraits had not been included in those exhibits nor mentioned in any publication save the museum's own catalogue.

Possible early suspects

Early in their investigation, the police began looking into a group of students at the nearby École des beaux-arts de Montréal. Mostly French-speaking, they had often visited the museum but had frequently been asked to leave before its official closing time so that the mostly English-speaking staff could take their tea. This had engendered considerable resentment on the students' part.

Police kept five of these students under 24-hour surveillance for two weeks. Eventually they decided they could not find any evidence, and dropped that part of the investigation. Alain Lacoursière, an art-theft specialist with the Montreal police who investigated the cold case in later years, by his own account taking it over just before the files were slated to be shredded in 1984, believes the students were not involved. "This crime was organized with a guy in charge who was 35 to 40 years old," well past his student years, he said in 2010.

Ransom negotiations and recovery attempts

In many art thefts the thieves seek ransom payments in return for the stolen works, and this happened twice in the MMFA thefts. Within a week of the robbery museum director David Giles Carter received a phone call from, he believed, one of the thieves. A man with a gravelly voice and an accent Carter described as "European" gave him directions to a phone booth near McGill University, near which one of the stolen pendants was found.

Soon afterwards, a brown manila Port of Montreal envelope arrived at the museum with snapshots of the stolen paintings. Carter nicknamed the thief "Port of Montreal" as a result, and dialogue was opened up between the museum and the thieves to negotiate a ransom. At first the thieves demanded $500,000, about a quarter of the works' stated value; later they halved that.

Carter demanded the thieves, or whoever it was negotiating on their behalf, give more proof they had the paintings than snapshots. In response, they told the museum's security director to go to a locker in Montreal Central Station. Inside, he found the Brueghel Landscape with Buildings and Wagon. It is the only one of the stolen paintings that has so far been recovered.

As a result of these negotiations, approximately a month later the museum's insurance companies and the Montreal police set up a sting operation. An undercover detective posed as an insurance adjustor and agreed to meet the thieves or their representative in an empty field in one of the city's suburbs, where he hoped the thieves would believe he was ready to hand over $5,000 for another one of the paintings. However, when one of the local police cruisers passed by, completely unaware of the plans, the thieves apparently came to realize what was actually going on and never met the undercover officer. The next day they called Carter and complained that they had been set up.

Lacoursière believes that it was actually the museum and the police who were being set up. The field the robbers had chosen as the meeting site had few nearby houses at the time and could easily have been monitored from some distance away, allowing the robbers to detect even the more subtle police presence necessary to support a sting operation. "It was all a smokescreen", he says. Since the thieves never reopened negotiations afterwards, he believes they never had any intention of returning the paintings at the time and were using the purported ransom negotiations as a diversion while they bought themselves more time to sell or otherwise dispose of the paintings.

The second attempt took place the following year. A few months after the museum closed for its three-year renovation project in May 1973, a caller to a member of the museum's board said he would share where the paintings were hidden for $10,000. André DeQuoy, one of the adjusters handling the case, was involved in the discussion and made it clear that while the insurance companies would pay for information leading to the discovery of the painting, they would not pay for the paintings themselves. After he agreed to deliver it personally to the source, the board made the money available.

The caller had instructed DeQuoy, who was being discreetly followed by police, to go to a certain phone booth in downtown Montreal one afternoon. From there the caller sent him to other phone booths elsewhere in the city, such as the Blue Bonnets race track, on St. Laurent Boulevard and at the Henri-Bourassa station on the Montreal Metro. The caller then informed DeQuoy that he had picked up the police tail and DeQuoy was to return to his office and await further instructions while the caller had the unmarked car called off.

DeQuoy did, and an hour later the caller said the police had been taken care of. Again he was sent out to phone booths, ultimately traveling back and forth across the island of Montreal to 11 of them, until at 4 a.m. the next morning he was told he could leave the envelope at the base of a sign in a vacant lot on St. Martin Boulevard, then return to the Henri-Bourassa phone booth where the caller would contact him again with the location of the paintings.

While DeQuoy waited for the call, he let the police know where he had been all night. But the caller never called, so the adjustor returned to his office. At 8 a.m. the caller called him there and told him the paintings were in a motel in Laval, north of Montreal. An intensive search of the building, however, produced neither the paintings nor any sign they had ever been there. The $10,000 was not recovered.

Later developments

Due to the minimal news coverage, in January 1973 Bill Bantey put together a circular, Attention: Stolen, depicting the stolen paintings and giving information such as their dimensions, in English and French. The idea was to distribute it widely throughout the international art community and familiarize possible buyers with the stolen works, a practice that was not common in art thefts at the time as most museums preferred to keep the news of their victimization to themselves. Major auction houses like Sotheby's and Christie's would not routinely check for whether art offered for sale through them was on lists of stolen works until 1985. "[We hope that] the works become so catalogued and so well-known that it would be unlikely that any collector or museum buyer could innocently purchase them," Bantey told the Gazette.

The museum and investigators did not make the ransom negotiations in the year after the thefts public knowledge until ten years later. "For years we thought our chances of recovery were better keeping everything quiet," said one police detective, explaining the decision. "But now our hopes are small. Maybe this will stimulate interest and produce something." But while it did allow police to confirm what they have only described as "certain facts", those have apparently not led to any progress in the case.

The recovered Brueghel was kept in storage at the museum by Ruth Jackson for ten years until a new frame could be purchased, after which it was returned to the place it had been exhibited prior to the theft. However, it was later determined that it was not by Brueghel but one of his students; Lacoursière believes the thieves may have chosen to return it due to doubts about its authenticity. It nevertheless remains on exhibit.

A similar fate befell the painting the museum bought with the money it received from its insurers. A group of 20 of them paid out nearly $2 million to settle the claim; they in turn posted a $50,000 reward for the return of the paintings, which under the terms of the insurance policies they legally owned as a result of paying the theft claim. The museum used the money to purchase a Rubens, The Leopards, which the museum promoted as the largest Rubens exhibited in Canada. But like the Brueghel, it was later reattributed to the painter's assistants, after a conservationist determined that its red pigments were mixed four decades after Rubens' death, reducing its value and interest to museumgoers. On the 35th anniversary of the robbery, in 2007, the museum thus returned it to storage and has never put it on display again.

Even the attribution of some of the stolen work has been called into question. When the de Heems were being prepared for their inclusion in Masterpieces from Montreal, a Parisian art historian the museum contacted suggested that they were in fact the work of another Dutch master, Evert Collier. The Rembrandt landscape, while indeed signed and dated by the artist, is one that both he and his students frequently returned to as a subject, and some historians are not entirely confident the painting was his even with the signature. The Gainsborough portrait, too, may in fact be the work of Joshua Reynolds, Gainsborough's rival, since its subject, Thomas Fletcher, is shown wearing a Madras regimental uniform, which he only started wearing in 1771, three years before his portrait was painted by Reynolds.

In 1992, on the 20th anniversary of the theft, a Radio-Canada story reported that the insurance companies now considered the paintings' value to have appreciated to $20 million. They had consequently increased the reward offer to $100,000. On behalf of the Montreal police, Lacoursière, who began investigating art crime in 1994, offered an additional million in 1999. No one has yet come forward to claim these rewards.

Lacoursière has had some promising leads over the years that have yielded nothing. He has been told that the paintings, or some of them, are in Italy, and that two Montreal men in the French city of Nice were possible suspects. One heroin addict he interviewed in Vancouver seemed to have inside information about the robbery, but everything he knew had been previously reported in the media; when he was asked about two details that police have withheld since only the actual robbers would know them, he was unable to do so.

"Smith"

One lead, however, has not been so easy for Lacoursière to dismiss. In 1998, a dealer he had gotten to know introduced him to a man who has been identified publicly only by the pseudonym "Smith". Smith told the detective he, too, had been a student at the École des beaux-arts at the time of the theft, explaining to him the tension between the students and museum staff.

In the course of their initial conversation, Lacoursière quickly came to believe Smith knew a great deal about the robbery, perhaps more than the police did. Although Smith said he had not been one of the five students kept under surveillance afterward, he told the detective that the rope used by the thieves to enter from the skylight was not grey as had been reported at the time, but yellow like the ones used at the school building. However, upon reviewing the original file and talking with one of the original investigators, Lacoursière found that any information on the colour of the rope had been deliberately withheld by police in order to confirm any later confessions or statements by possible suspects. He considered Smith's statements "highly suspicious".

Lacoursière investigated Smith's background, and found that a year after finishing his five-year course at the school, Smith had spent a quarter of a million dollars to buy himself a house and a local woodworking company. Lacoursière could not determine how Smith might have acquired that amount of money at such a relatively young age. He implied in 2010 it might have been from selling the stolen work.

According to Lacoursière, Smith even told him that he would at some point in the future tell him something about the robbery. In 2007, during the filming of "Le Columbo de l’art" ("The Colombo of Art"), a Radio-Canada special on his career as an art-theft detective, Lacoursière visited Smith and offered him the million-dollar cheque on camera. Smith, however, simply laughed, and invited the camera crew into his house so they could see for themselves that he had none of the stolen paintings.

In 2010, Quebec journalist Sylvain Larocque interviewed Smith by telephone. While he again denied any role in the theft himself, he claimed that professors and porters at the Université du Québec à Montréal, which the École des beaux-arts had been merged into in 1969, were behind the robbery. They were possibly, he claimed, the same people behind a robbery at the university a few weeks earlier.

The following year Lacoursière received a link to a video in an email from Smith, possibly intended to tease the detective, who by then had retired. It was a Mercedes-Benz advertisement from Hong Kong in which bank robbers steal a briefcase from a bank vault, then escape in a Mercedes. They elude capture but leave the briefcase behind; inside is a long-lost stolen da Vinci painting.

Theories of the paintings' current whereabouts

The robbery is now largely forgotten, except by the insurance companies and police, who continue to search. "Like a death in the family, you have to let it drop," Bantey says. However, in 2009, Paul Lavallée, the museum's director at the time, said it continues to affect the museum, since it might not be able to reclaim the works even if they were recovered. "[W]e would be strapped for funds," he said, even if the insurer offered them to the museum at a discount.

It is possible the paintings may have been destroyed to prevent them from being used as evidence against those in possession of them. But Lacoursière believes they were likely sold through smaller dealers who may not have known they were stolen, or cared if they did, to collectors who likewise keep them private, especially today, since they cannot sell them. He also notes that criminal organizations have found stolen art useful in other ways. During the 1994–2002 Quebec Biker war, he recalls, he learned that one member of the Montreal-area Hells Angels served as a fence for art thieves, selling stolen art to the Italian Mafia at 10 percent of its price, who in turn used the names of dead residents of the affluent suburb of Westmount on faked provenance forms.

While it is not believed likely that the original robbers were affiliated with organized crime, the ransom attempts may point in that direction. The Port of Montreal envelope in which the snapshots of the stolen art was sent may suggest the involvement of the West End Gang, an Irish-dominated group that is one of Canada's oldest and strongest criminal organizations, which has historically been based in the city's port. Bantey, however, doubts this based on his familiarity with the city's criminal element from his journalism days. "[They] were interested in prostitution and drugs" exclusively at the time, he says, and no one involved would have had the expertise required to pull off the robbery. Nor does he believe the thieves were motivated by separatism or any other political cause, just a desire to enrich themselves.

Despite some suggestions the paintings, assuming they still exist, are still in Montreal, or elsewhere in Canada or the U.S. or Europe, the investigators who will discuss this believe the art has been moved to Latin America. Lacoursière notes that many of the West End Gang often spend their winters in, and retire to, Costa Rica. Police there have not responded to requests for assistance from their counterparts in Montreal. Bantey believes the paintings are in South America somewhere. "I've heard several people I respect say that."

The police files on the robbery remain closed to public inspection as the case is still considered open.

See also

1972 in art
1972 in Canada
Crime in Canada
List of stolen paintings
Timeline of Montreal history
2011 Montreal Museum of Fine Arts theft, the only subsequent theft in the museum's history, from which one of two stolen pieces have been recovered; took place on September 3, one day before 39th anniversary of 1972 robbery
John Tillmann, Canadian art thief considered the most successful of all time
Isabella Stewart Gardner Museum theft, 1990 robbery of 13 pieces worth $500 million from a Boston museum that was until 2019 the largest art theft and largest theft of private property in history; also unsolved.
2019 Dresden heist, theft of jewelry and related items valued at nearly €1 billion, making it the largest such theft in history

References

Art crime
Museum crime
Robberies
Unsolved crimes in Canada
Crime in Montreal
History of Montreal
1972 crimes in Canada
September 1972 events in Canada
1972 in Quebec